Vicente Martínez (born 2 November 1946) is a Mexican former wrestler who competed in the 1972 Summer Olympics.

References

External links
 

1946 births
Living people
Olympic wrestlers of Mexico
Wrestlers at the 1972 Summer Olympics
Mexican male sport wrestlers